Hypermobility may refer to:

 Hypermobility (joints), joints that stretch farther than normal
 Hypermobility spectrum disorder, a heritable connective tissue disorder
 Hypermobility (travel), frequent travelers

It should not be confused with flexibility.